Michał Gabiński (born February 11, 1987) is a Polish professional basketball player.

Professional career
In his career, Gabiński has played with his hometown team, Stalowa Wola, as well as other Polish first division teams. Since 2012, he has been under contract with Śląsk Wrocław. In 2014, he was named the Polish Cup MVP.

References

1987 births
Living people
KK Włocławek players
People from Stalowa Wola
Polish men's basketball players
Power forwards (basketball)
Śląsk Wrocław basketball players
Turów Zgorzelec players